"Never Knew Love Like This Before" is a 1980 song written and produced by songwriters James Mtume and Reggie Lucas for American R&B recording artist Stephanie Mills's fourth studio album Sweet Sensation (1980). According to Lucas's wife, Kay, the song was inspired by the birth of their baby daughter, Lisa.

The song became Mills's biggest hit on the US Billboard Pop Singles Chart, where it peaked at number six, outperforming her previously highest charting single, "What Cha' Gonna Do with My Lovin'", which peaked at number 22. The single was also successful on the R&B and Adult Contemporary charts, peaking at No. 12 and No. five, respectively.  It was a bigger success in the UK where it peaked at number four.

The record won Best R&B Song and Best Female R&B Vocal Performance at the 1981 Grammy Awards, vanquishing competition that included Aretha Franklin, Diana Ross, Roberta Flack, and Minnie Riperton. The song gave the title to the fourth episode of the second season of FX American drama television series Pose; in the episode, it was performed in playback, in the episode's final number, by the character of Candy, portrayed by Angelica Ross.

Personnel 
 Howard King – drums
 Basil Fearington – bass
 James Mtume – keyboards
 Hubert Eaves III – keyboards
 Reggie Lucas – guitar
 Ed Moore – guitar
 James Mtume – percussion
 Ed Walsh – synthesizer programming
 Tawatha Agee, Gwen Guthrie, Brenda White King, James Mtume & Reggie Lucas  – background vocals
 Gene Blanco – String and horn arrangements

Charts

Weekly charts

Year-end charts

Cover versions
In 1999, French band Organiz' covered the song. The track reached on number five on French Singles Chart, and 6 on Belgian Singles Chart.
Thomas Anders covered the song for his 1995 album Souled.
In 2013, Jessie Ware covered the song for the soundtrack to the film I Give It a Year.

Composition
The Intro and Verse chords are [B E  F#/A#  D#m7 G#m7 C#m9 E/F#], cycling through the diatonic Circle of fifths in the key of B major.  The Chorus section chords are [Emaj7 D#m7 C#m7 Emaj7 D#m7 C#m7 Emaj7 D#m7 C#sus4 C#7 E].

Certifications

References

External links
 
Thomas Anders - Never Knew Love Like This Before on YouTube

1980 songs
1980 singles
Stephanie Mills songs
Songs written by Reggie Lucas
Songs written by James Mtume
20th Century Fox Records singles
Disco songs